In video games, a scripted sequence is a pre-defined series of events that occur when triggered by player location or actions that play out in the game engine.

Function
Some scripted sequences are used to play short cutscenes that the player has little control of.  However, they are commonly used in games such as Half-Life or Call of Duty to bring in new enemies or challenges to the player in a seemingly surprising manner while they are still playing.  They can also present further plot points without interrupting the player and making them watch a cutscene.  The intended results of this style of presentation is to increase immersion and to maintain a smooth-flowing experience that keeps the player's interest.

Scripted sequences trigger a number of things. A timer, a checkpoint or the progress of the game could activate a scripted sequence. For players that speedrun video games, skipping these scripted sequences that would otherwise slow down their completion time requires skill, and being able to manipulate the game's hit boxes so that the game does not trigger a sequence is necessary for fast completions.

Examples in-game
Half-Life uses scripted sequences throughout the game (aside from one short cutscene). Walking near other characters can trigger scripted sequences such as dialog. These dialog sequences tell the game's story in a different manner and are sometimes there simply for entertainment purposes.

Gears of War uses scripted sequences between sections of game play to provide objective reminders and tell the game's story without the use of cut scenes. The game triggers a playable scripted sequence once all of the enemies have been cleared in an area, usually these sequences play while the player moves to the next area.

Resident Evil 4 has many examples of scripted sequences that utilize a quick time event to feature more action-packed game play. As the player navigates the level, they must react to the event to continue.

Criticisms
Games such as Call of Duty have been criticized for their reliance on these sequences, as many feel they tend to guide a player through a game by the invisible hand of the developers, blocking progression with invisible walls until the scripted sequence has triggered further progression. Also, the use of scripted sequences may diminish replay value as the surprise effect is negated upon subsequent play-throughs.

References

Video game design
Video game development
Fiction forms